Law and Disorder in Lagos is a 2010 British documentary film by Louis Theroux.

Theroux journeys to Lagos, the largest city in Nigeria, to investigate the nature of law and order in the rapidly expanding city. There he follows the Government-run paramilitary task force KAI (Kick Against Indiscipline), notorious union leader MC Oluomo, and young gang members known as "Area Boys" who unofficially run neighbourhoods for money.

On 30 September 2015, Kunle "Mammok" Mamowora, Theroux's guide around Lagos and Chief Security Officer to MC Oluomo, was shot and killed by assailants who were believed to be members of a rival political group.

References

External links
 

Louis Theroux's BBC Two specials
BBC television documentaries
2010 television specials
Documentary films about Lagos
Television episodes set in Nigeria
BBC travel television series